The 2003–04 CBA season is the ninth CBA season.

The season ran from November 16, 2003 to March 3, 2004. No teams were promoted from the Second Division, while two teams were set to be relegated. However, relegations were abolished after all Relegation Round matches have been played.

Regular Season Standings

Playoffs 

The top 8 teams in the regular season advanced to the playoffs. The quarterfinals and semifinals once again used best-of-three series to determine the advancing team.

In the Final series, Guangdong Southern Tigers defeated Bayi Rockets (3-1).

Teams in bold advanced to the next round. The numbers to the left of each team indicate the team's seeding in regular season, and the numbers to the right indicate the number of games the team won in that round. Home court advantage belongs to the team with the better regular season record; teams enjoying the home advantage are shown in italics.

Relegations
The bottom 4 teams participated in the Relegation Round. Each team played 4 games against each of the other three teams, for a total of 12 games.

2 teams were set to be relegated. However, relegations were abolished after all Relegation Round matches have been played.

References

See also
Chinese Basketball Association

 
Chinese Basketball Association seasons
League
CBA